Julia Marta Wieniawa-Narkiewicz (born 23 December 1998) is a Polish actress and singer. She is best known for her performance as Zosia Wolska in Nobody Sleeps in the Woods Tonight.

References

External links 

1998 births
Living people
Polish film actresses